Samson Dutch Boy Gym (born July 11, 1972 in Changhan, Roi-Et, Thailand) is one of the fight names used by former professional boxer and Muay Thai practitioner from Thailand.

Muay Thai career
Somboon Phantasi. His Muay Thai ring name was Saenmuangnoi Lukchaopormahesak, in Muaythai, he was a famous and popular Muay Thai fighter, ever lost-won with Veeraphol Sahaprom 2 times. He is a former Lumpinee Stadium 118 lb Champion and Rajadamnern Stadium 115 lb Champion. From the fierce fighting style, hence he was nicknamed "Samson".

Professional career
He won the minor World Boxing Federation (WBF) world super flyweight title in September 1994, in his fourth professional fight. He would hold that title for the next eight years, beating such opponents as Cruz Carbajal, Hugo Rafael Soto, Diosdado Gabi, and Genaro Garcia. In total, he made 38 consecutive defences of the title before retiring in April 2002 with a final record of 43-0. His other ring names were Samson Esarn (also spelled Samson Isaan), Samson Elite Gym, Samson Kratingdaenggym, Samson 3-K Battery, Samson Toyota-Thailand.

Although in 1998, he had a car accident that required rib surgery. But it's not an obstacle for boxing. He continued to set an unbeaten record. In his first title defense against Indonesian challenger Ippo Gala in 1994 in Chiang Rai, he fought on the undercard of British's Johnny Nelson vs. Nikolay Kulpin from Kazakhstan, Nelson defended his WBF world heavyweight title for the first time. The result of the fight was Nelson won by split decision after 12 rounds. It is also considered to be the first world-class heavyweight boxing event to take place in Thailand.

In 1996, there was criticism that he should be a champion in a major and more standardized organization. His manager had brought him to the United States to negotiate his fight under Don King and the president of the World Boxing Council (WBC) José Sulaimán stable, but the negotiations over the broadcast rights back to Thailand were unsuccessful. So he's only fought in non-title fight in Great Western Forum, California (no records in the BoxRec).

His fee in a professional boxing was the highest that was about one million baht, including the gold necklace received from each sponsor again a lot. After retirement, he had a lot of assets. Therefore, he has a comfortable living condition, taxi driver is his hobby.

Titles and accomplishments

Muay Thai
Lumpinee Stadium
 1991 Lumpinee Stadium 118 lbs Champion 
 1993 Lumpinee Stadium Fight of the Year (vs. Detduang Por Pongsawang)
Rajadamnern Stadium
 1992 Rajadamnern Stadium 115 lbs Champion
Awards
 1991 Sports Writers Association of Thailand Fighter of the Year

Boxing
 1994–2002 World Boxing Federation World Super Flyweight Champion (One time, 38 defenses)

Professional boxing record

Muay Thai record

|-  style="background:#fbb;"
| 1994-03-08 ||Loss||align=left| Dara-Ek Sitrungsap || Lumpinee Stadium || Bangkok, Thailand || Decision || 5 || 3:00
|-  style="background:#cfc;"
| 1994-02-18 ||Win||align=left| Jomhodlek Rattanachot || Lumpinee Stadium || Bangkok, Thailand || Decision  || 5 || 3:00
|-  style="background:#fbb;"
| 1994-01-25 ||Loss||align=left| Saenklai Sit Kru Od || Lumpinee Stadium || Bangkok, Thailand || Decision  || 5 || 3:00
|-  style="background:#cfc;"
| 1993-12-10 ||Win ||align=left| Detduang Por Ponsawang || Lumpinee Stadium || Bangkok, Thailand || Decision || 5 || 3:00
|-  style="background:#cfc;"
| 1993-11-12 ||Win ||align=left| Duangsompong Por Ponsawang || Lumpinee Stadium || Bangkok, Thailand || Decision || 5 || 3:00
|-  style="background:#cfc;"
| 1993-10-20 ||Win ||align=left| Jaoweha Loogtabfah || Rajadamnern Stadium || Bangkok, Thailand || Decision || 5 || 3:00
|-  style="background:#cfc;"
| 1993-09-03 ||Win ||align=left| Jomhodlek Rattanachot || Lumpinee Stadium || Bangkok, Thailand || Decision || 5 || 3:00
|-  style="background:#fbb;"
| 1993-07-20 ||Loss||align=left| Dara-Ek Sitrungsap || Lumpinee Stadium || Bangkok, Thailand || Decision || 5 || 3:00
|-  style="background:#fbb;"
| 1993-05-11 ||Loss ||align=left| Veeraphol Sahaprom || Lumpinee Stadium || Bangkok, Thailand || TKO (Right Cross) || 2 ||
|-  style="background:#fbb;"
| 1993-04-02 ||Loss||align=left| Singdam Or.Ukrit || Lumpinee Stadium || Bangkok, Thailand || Decision  || 5 || 3:00
|-  style="background:#fbb;"
| 1993-03-12 ||Loss||align=left| Saenklai Sit Kru Od || Lumpinee Stadium || Bangkok, Thailand || Decision  || 5 || 3:00
|-  style="background:#cfc;"
| 1993-02-19 ||Win ||align=left| Dara-Ek Sitrungsap || Lumpinee Stadium || Bangkok, Thailand || Decision || 5 || 3:00
|-  style="background:#cfc;"
| 1993-01-15||Win ||align=left| Kiewmorakot Prainan || Lumpinee Stadium || Bangkok, Thailand || KO (Left Uppercut) || 3 ||
|-  style="background:#cfc;"
| 1992-12-08 ||Win ||align=left| Saenklai Sit Kru Od || Lumpinee Stadium || Bangkok, Thailand || Decision  || 5 || 3:00
|-  style="background:#cfc;"
| 1992-10-30 ||Win||align=left| Jaroensak Kiatnakornchon || Lumpinee Stadium || Bangkok, Thailand || TKO (Punches) || 3 ||
|-  style="background:#cfc;"
| 1992-09-28 ||Win ||align=left| Lakhin Wassandasit || Rajadamnern Stadium || Bangkok, Thailand || Decision  || 5 || 3:00 
|-
! style=background:white colspan=9 | 
|-  style="background:#fbb;"
| 1992-08-04 ||Loss ||align=left| Lakhin Wassandasit || Lumpinee Stadium || Bangkok, Thailand || Decision  || 5 || 3:00
|-  style="background:#cfc;"
| 1992-06-26 ||Win ||align=left| Taweesaklek Ploysakda || Lumpinee Stadium || Bangkok, Thailand || KO || 2 ||
|-  style="background:#fbb;"
| 1992-06-02 ||Loss||align=left| Jaroensak Kiatnakornchon || Lumpinee Stadium || Bangkok, Thailand || Decision || 5 || 3:00
|-  style="background:#cfc;"
| 1992-04-29 ||Win ||align=left| Lakhin Wassandasit || Rajadamnern Stadium || Bangkok, Thailand || Decision  || 5 || 3:00
|-  style="background:#fbb;"
| 1992-03-31 ||Loss||align=left| Jaroensak Kiatnakornchon || Lumpinee Stadium || Bangkok, Thailand || Decision || 5 || 3:00 
|-
! style=background:white colspan=9 |
|-  style="background:#fbb;"
| 1992-03-06 ||Loss||align=left| Langsuan Panyuthaphum || Lumpinee Stadium || Bangkok, Thailand || Decision || 5 || 3:00
|-  style="background:#cfc;"
| 1992-01-24 ||Win ||align=left| Chartchainoi Chaorai-Oi || Lumpinee Stadium || Bangkok, Thailand || Decision || 5 || 3:00
|-  style="background:#cfc;"
| 1991-11-29 ||Win ||align=left| Saenklai Sit Kru Od || Lumpinee Stadium || Bangkok, Thailand || KO (Spinning Elbow) || 2 || 
|-
! style=background:white colspan=9 |
|-  style="background:#cfc;"
| 1991-10-30 ||Win ||align=left| Veeraphol Sahaprom || Rajadamnern Stadium || Bangkok, Thailand || KO (Left Cross) || 2 || 
|-
! style=background:white colspan=9 |
|-  style="background:#cfc;"
| 1991-09-20 ||Win ||align=left| Saenklai Sit Kru Od || Lumpinee Stadium || Bangkok, Thailand || Decision  || 5 || 3:00
|-  style="background:#cfc;"
| 1991-08-28 ||Win ||align=left| Thongchai Tor. Silachai || Rajadamnern Stadium || Bangkok, Thailand || Decision  || 5 || 3:00
|-  style="background:#cfc;"
| 1991-07-23 ||Win||align=left| Graiwannoi Sit Kru Od || Lumpinee Stadium || Bangkok, Thailand || KO || 3 ||
|-  style="background:#cfc;"
| 1991-05-24 ||Win||align=left| Pepsi Biyapan || Lumpinee Stadium || Bangkok, Thailand || KO (Left Cross)|| 5 ||
|-  style="background:#c5d2ea;"
| 1991-05-03 ||Draw||align=left| Pepsi Biyapan || Lumpinee Stadium || Bangkok, Thailand || Decision  || 5 || 3:00
|-  style="background:#c5d2ea;"
| 1991-04-09 ||Draw||align=left| Pepsi Biyapan || Lumpinee Stadium || Bangkok, Thailand || Decision  || 5 || 3:00
|-  style="background:#cfc;"
| 1991-03-19 ||Win||align=left| Rittidej Sor.Ploenjit || Lumpinee Stadium || Bangkok, Thailand || Decision  || 5 || 3:00
|-  style="background:#cfc;"
| 1991-02-08 ||Win||align=left| Dentaksin Sor Suwanapakdee || Lumpinee Stadium || Bangkok, Thailand || Decision  || 5 || 3:00
|-  style="background:#cfc;"
| 1991-01-18 ||Win||align=left| Graiwannoi Sit Kru Od  || Lumpinee Stadium || Bangkok, Thailand || Decision  || 5 || 3:00
|-  style="background:#cfc;"
| 1990-12-21 ||Win||align=left| Rittidet Kerdpayak || Lumpinee Stadium || Bangkok, Thailand || Decision  || 5 || 3:00

|-  style="background:#cfc;"
| 1990-11-28 ||Win||align=left| Chettha Kiatchayong || Rajadamnern Stadium || Bangkok, Thailand || Decision  || 5 || 3:00

|-  style="background:#fbb;"
| 1990-10-19 || Loss||align=left| Saenklai Sit Kru Od || Lumpinee Stadium || Bangkok, Thailand || Decision  || 5 || 3:00
|-  style="background:#fbb;"
| 1990-09-21 || Loss||align=left| Saenklai Sit Kru Od || Lumpinee Stadium || Bangkok, Thailand || Decision  || 5 || 3:00
|-  style="background:#cfc;"
| 1990-08-28 ||Win||align=left| Dentaksin Kiatrataphol || Lumpinee Stadium || Bangkok, Thailand || Decision  || 5 || 3:00
|-  style="background:#cfc;"
| 1990-06-22 || Win ||align=left| Takrawlek Dejrath || Lumpinee Stadium || Bangkok, Thailand || Decision || 5 || 3:00
|-  style="background:#fbb;"
| 1990-05-25 ||Loss||align=left| Dentaksin Kiatrataphol || Lumpinee Stadium || Bangkok, Thailand || Decision  || 5 || 3:00

|-  style="background:#cfc;"
| 1990-05-11 || Win ||align=left| Chalong Silpakorn || Lumpinee Stadium || Bangkok, Thailand || Decision || 5 || 3:00 
|-
! style=background:white colspan=9 |

|-  style="background:#cfc;"
| 1990-03-23 || Win ||align=left| Kiewmorakot Praianan || Lumpinee Stadium || Bangkok, Thailand || Decision || 5 || 3:00 
|-
! style=background:white colspan=9 |

|-  style="background:#cfc;"
| 1990-03-02 || Win ||align=left| Chettha Kiatchayong|| Lumpinee Stadium || Bangkok, Thailand || Decision|| 5 ||3:00

|-  style="background:#cfc;"
| 1990-02-13 ||Win||align=left| Kiewmorakot Praianan || Lumpinee Stadium || Bangkok, Thailand ||  Decision || 5 || 3:00

|-  style="background:#cfc;"
| 1990-01-14 ||Win||align=left| Chalong Silpakorn || Lumpinee Stadium || Bangkok, Thailand ||  Decision || 5 || 3:00

|-  style="background:#cfc;"
| 1989-12-08 ||Win||align=left| Chalong Silpakorn || Lumpinee Stadium || Bangkok, Thailand ||  Decision || 5 || 3:00
|-
! style=background:white colspan=9 |

|-  style="background:#cfc;"
| 1989-10-30 ||Win||align=left| Sornsuriya Sor.Singsuriya ||  || Chanthaburi province, Thailand ||  Decision || 5 || 3:00

|-  style="background:#cfc;"
| 1989-10-14 ||Win||align=left| Kiewmorakot Praianan || Lumpinee Stadium || Bangkok, Thailand ||  Decision || 5 || 3:00

|-  style="background:#fbb;"
| 1989-09-10 ||Loss||align=left| Rittidej Sor.Ploenchit || Samrong Stadium || Samut Prakan, Thailand || Decision  || 5 || 3:00
|-
! style=background:white colspan=9 |

|-  style="background:#cfc;"
| 1989-08-13 ||Win||align=left| Sornsuriya Sor.Singsuriya || Lumpinee Stadium || Bangkok, Thailand ||  Decision || 5 || 3:00

|-  style="background:#cfc;"
| 1989-06-30 ||Win||align=left| Grandprixnoi Muangchaiyapoom || Lumpinee Stadium || Bangkok, Thailand ||  Decision || 5 || 3:00

|-  style="background:#cfc;"
| 1989-06-06 ||Win||align=left| Denchai Looksamrong || Lumpinee Stadium || Bangkok, Thailand || Decision  || 5 || 3:00

|-  style="background:#cfc;"
| 1989-05-16 ||Win||align=left| Sangasak Lukborai || Lumpinee Stadium || Bangkok, Thailand || Decision  || 5 || 3:00

|-  style="background:#cfc;"
| 1989-04-15 ||Win||align=left| Chanchainoi Sor.Inthapat || || Thailand || Decision  || 5 || 3:00

|-  style="background:#cfc;"
| 1989-03-24 ||Win||align=left| Saenrak Kiat5K || Samrong Stadium || Samut Prakan, Thailand || KO || 4 || 

|-  style="background:#cfc;"
| 1989-02-24 ||Win||align=left| Nongnarong Looksamrong || Lumpinee Stadium || Bangkok, Thailand || Decision  || 5 || 3:00

|-  style="background:#cfc;"
| 1989-01-29 ||Win||align=left| Denchai Looksamrong || Samrong Stadium || Samut Prakan, Thailand || Decision  || 5 || 3:00

|-  style="background:#cfc;"
| 1989-01-08 ||Win||align=left| Nongnarong Looksamrong || Samrong Stadium || Samut Prakan, Thailand || KO || 4 || 
|-
|-
| colspan=9 | Legend:

References

External links
 

World boxing champions
1972 births
Living people
Super-flyweight boxers
Samson Dutch Boy Gym
Samson Dutch Boy Gym
Samson Dutch Boy Gym
Samson Dutch Boy Gym